Serapias is a genus of terrestrial orchids that can be found all over southern Europe to Asia Minor. The genus was named after Serapis, a syncretic Hellenistic-Egyptian god in Antiquity. 
Serapias have spurless flowers and usually go dormant during the winter seasons.

Species 
Serapias bergonii
Serapias cordigera
Serapias cossyrensis
Serapias istriaca
Serapias levantina
Serapias lingua
Serapias neglecta
Serapias nurrica
Serapias olbia
Serapias orientalis
Serapias parviflora
Serapias perez-chiscanoi
Serapias politisii
Serapias strictiflora
Serapias vomeracea

Natural hybrids 
Serapias × albertii (S. neglecta × S. vomeracea)
Serapias × ambigua (S. cordigera × S. lingua)
Serapias × ambigua nothosubsp ambigua (S. cordigera × S. lingua)
Serapias × ambigua nothosubsp panormosana (S. cordigera subsp. cretica × S. lingua)
Serapias × cypria (S. bergonii × S. orientalis subsp. levantina)
Serapias × euxina (S. bergonii × S. orientalis)
Serapias × garganica (S. orientalis × S. vomeracea)
Serapias × godferyi (S. cordigera × S. neglecta)
Serapias × halacsyana (S. bergonii × S. cordigera)
Serapias × halicarnassia (S. bergonii × S. orientalis subsp. carica)
Serapias × intermedia (S. lingua × S. vomeracea)
Serapias × kelleri (S. cordigera × S. vomeracea)
Serapias × lupiensis (S. lingua × S. politisii)
Serapias × meridionalis (S. lingua × S. neglecta)
Serapias × oulmesiaca (S. lingua × S. cordigera subsp. cordigera)
Serapias × provincialis (S. cordigera × S. olbia)
Serapias × pulae (S. istriaca × S. lingua)
Serapias × rainei (S. cordigera × S. parviflora)
Serapias × todaroi (S. lingua × S. parviflora)
Serapias × walravensiana (S. orientalis subsp. carica × S. lingua)

External links 

 
Orchideae genera